USS Nightingale (SP-523) was a Nightingale-class patrol boat acquired by the U.S. Navy for the task of patrolling coast and harbor waters of the United States.

Nightingale, a motorboat built by C. W. Ferguson, Groton, Connecticut, was acquired by the Navy from J. L. Hubbard, Groton, 11 June 1917 and commissioned 29 June 1917 at Newport, Rhode Island.

World War I service 
 

On special duty 18 September, she maneuvered with a Chilean submarine off Fishers Island. Continuing patrol duty, Nightingale directed all commercial traffic from the experimental zone 31 October, shifting station to Fishers Island Sound 11 November.
 
Nightingale continued on patrol until 8 September 1919 when she was placed out of service. She was sold to G. A. Ford Yachts Agency, New York City 15 December 1919.

References

External links 
 NavSource Online: Section Patrol Craft Photo Archive - Nightingale (SP 523)
 Photo gallery at Naval Historical Center

Ships built in Groton, Connecticut
Patrol vessels of the United States Navy
World War I patrol vessels of the United States